Le Dit des rues de Paris is a 554-verse poem in octosyllabic rhyming couplets, written by Guillot of Paris and describing the streets of Paris between around 1280 and 1300. It deals with 310 streets, organised into the city's three main districts at that time:
to the north on the Rive Droite, the Outre-Grand-Pont district, also known as "la Ville" ("the city")
to the south on the Rive Gauche, the Outre-Petit-Pont district, also known as "l'Université" ("the University")
on the island, the Cité district, cradle of Paris
It does not include cul de sacs, which its author calls rues sans chief.

References

Bibliography
 Guillot of Paris : Le Dit des rues de Paris avec préface, notes et glossaire par Edgar Mareuse.
 Étienne Barbazan, Crapelet, Méon, Joly de Fleury : Fabliaux et contes des poètes françois des XI, XII, XIII, XIV et XVe siècles Tome 2
 Jean de La Tynna : Dictionnaire topographique, étymologique et historique des rues de Paris
 Jacques Hillairet : Dictionnaire historique des rues de Paris

External links 
 http://www.arlima.net/eh/guillot_de_paris.html
 Le Paris De Guillot avec plan et légende sur wikisource

1280s in France
1290s in France
French poems
13th-century poems
Medieval French literature
Medieval Paris